Kentucky Route 1303 is a  state highway in Kenton County, Kentucky. The southern terminus of the route is at KY 536 in Independence. The northern terminus is at U.S. Route 25, U.S. Route 42 and U.S. Route 127 in Lakeside Park.  On its way to KY 536 it goes through many towns.  These towns include Edgewood, Erlanger, and Independence. The southernmost segment of the route is named Bristow Road, a moniker carried by KY 536 east of KY 1303. At Richardson Road in Independence, KY 1303 becomes Turkeyfoot Road, a name the route retains to its northern terminus.

Route description
KY 1303 begins at an intersection with KY 536 in Independence, heading north on two-lane undivided Bristow Road. The road passes farmland before heading through suburban residential neighborhoods. The route widens into a five-lane road with a center left-turn lane and intersects Richardson Road, at which point the name changes to Turkeyfoot Road. KY 1303 intersects KY 1829 and forms a concurrency with that route. After KY 1829 splits to the west, the road passes through more suburban neighborhoods with some woods, heading into Erlanger. The route intersects the southern terminus of KY 236  and continues to the northeast, entering Crestview Hills. KY 1303 heads into commercial areas and becomes a four-lane divided highway as it reaches an interchange with I-275. Past this interchange, the route narrows into a two-lane undivided road and passes through residential neighborhoods, entering Lakeside Park. KY 1303 curves to the northwest and comes to its northern terminus at an intersection with US 25/US 42/US 127.

Major intersections

References

1303
Transportation in Kenton County, Kentucky